President's College is a senior secondary school located in Golden Grove, East Coast Demerara, Guyana. Students can enter the school through the National Grade Six Assessment and the lower sixth form in the academic performance of the student at the Caribbean Secondary Education Certificate.

History
President's College, opened in 1985, was founded by the late president of Guyana Forbes Burnham, who launched the project in 1983 but died before the school opened.

Students used to be selected from the top two percent of candidates in the Secondary School Entrance Examination (SSEE) and subjected to an evaluation process including interviews with school personnel. Now students are allowed to transfer into President's College and preference is given to those from more remote areas. The school allows students to attend without being residential, thereby functioning as a boarding and a day school.

On April 26, 2004, a large fire destroyed the boy's dormitory resulting in $45 million–$100 million in property damage but no injuries or fatalities. As a result of the fire, more than 100 students had to find alternative housing, usually off-campus. Reconstruction was started a year later but was delayed due to the floods of 2005. In June 2006, the Ministry of Education announced a new plan for rebuilding the dormitory and blamed their current contractor for the delays.

Notable alumni
 Ruel Johnson - youngest winner of the Guyana Prize for Literature.

References

External links
 GuyanaOnline.net
 President's College GY

High schools and secondary schools in Guyana
Educational institutions established in 1985
1985 establishments in Guyana